Wayne James Hillman (November 13, 1938 – November 24, 1990) was a Canadian professional ice hockey defenceman who played in the National Hockey League (NHL) for the Chicago Blackhawks, New York Rangers, Minnesota North Stars and Philadelphia Flyers. He also played in the World Hockey Association (WHA) with the Cleveland Crusaders. 

He was born in Kirkland Lake, Ontario, and was the younger brother of defenceman Larry Hillman and defenceman Floyd Hillman, and was the uncle of former NHL forward Brian Savage. 

Hillman played in one game during the 1961 Stanley Cup Finals for Chicago on April 16, 1961, so his name was engraved on the Stanley Cup with the rest of the team. 

Hillman died of cancer on November 24, 1990.

References

External links
 
Picture of Wayne Hillman's Name on the 1961 Stanley Cup Plaque

1938 births
1990 deaths
Buffalo Bisons (AHL) players
Canadian ice hockey defencemen
Chicago Blackhawks players
Cleveland Crusaders players
Ice hockey people from Ontario
Minnesota North Stars players
New York Rangers players
Philadelphia Flyers players
Stanley Cup champions
Sportspeople from Kirkland Lake